The Girl Guides Association of the Kingdom of Tonga is the national Guiding organization of Tonga. It serves 204 members (as of 2003). Founded in 1952, the girls-only organization became an associate member of the World Association of Girl Guides and Girl Scouts in 1987.

Guiding was started in Tonga at the instigation of Sālote Tupou III in 1952, and the first companies were formed on the island of Tongatapu. In 1955, Halaevalu Mataʻaho ʻAhomeʻe, consort of King Tāufaāhau Tupou IV became commissioner of the association. Queen Sālote opened a headquarters for the association in Nukuʻalofa in 1960. The first Brownie pack was started in 1957, and during the next few years, Guiding spread to the islands of Ha'apai and Vava'u, and to ʻEua in 1971. In 1986 the Guide association signed a Deed of Transfer which gave Tonga, formerly a branch association, self-government in all areas of work. Guiding started again in 1998 on Vava'u Island. In November 2012 the association opened a new training center. The association celebrated its 65th anniversary in 2017.

See also
Tonga branch of The Scout Association

References 

Tonga
Scouting and Guiding in Tonga
Youth organizations established in 1952
1952 establishments in Tonga